
Year 843 (DCCCXLIII) was a common year starting on Monday (link will display the full calendar) of the Julian calendar.

Events 
 By place 

 Europe 
 August – Treaty of Verdun: The Frankish Empire is divided into three kingdoms, between the three surviving sons of the late emperor Louis the Pious. King Louis the German receives the eastern portion (everything east of the River Rhine), called the Eastern Frankish Realm, which is the precursor to modern-day Germany. Emperor Lothair I receives the central portion (Low Countries, Alsace, Lorraine, Burgundy and the northern half of Italy), called the Central Frankish Realm. King Charles the Bald receives the western portion (everything west of the River Rhône), called the Western Frankish Realm, which later becomes France.
 Battle of Blain: Breton forces under Erispoe, count of Vannes, defeat the Franks led by Renaud d'Herbauges, near the town of Messac, at the River Vilaine. This battle marks a Breton war between Charles the Bald and Nominoe, duke of Brittany.
 Summer – Viking raiders attack Nantes, located on the River Loire; they kill the town's bishop along with many of the clergy, and murder men, women and children. They plunder the western parts of Aquitaine and reach an island north of the mouth of the River Garonne, near what later will be La Rochelle. There the Vikings bring materials from the mainland and build houses to spend the winter.

 British Isles 
 King Kenneth MacAlpin (Cináed mac Ailpín) of the Scots also becomes king of the Picts; he is crowned (on the Stone of Destiny) as first monarch of the new nation of Scotland. The Alpin Dynasty of Scottish kings begins to reign.

 Arabian Empire 
 Summer – A Byzantine expedition, led by Theoktistos, conquers Crete from the Saracens. After initial success, he is forced to abandon his army, due to political intrigues in Constantinople. The troops are left behind and slaughtered by the Arabs.Treadgold (1997), p. 447.
 Al-Andalus: The city of Zaragossa rises against the Umayyad Emirate of Córdoba in modern-day Spain.

 Asia 
 In the Chinese capital of Chang'an, a large fire consumes 4,000 homes, warehouses and other buildings in the East Market, yet the rest of the city is at a safe distance from the blaze which is largely quarantined in East Central Chang'an, thanks to the large width of roads in Chang'an that produce fire breaks.

 By topic 

 Religion 
 March 11 – Feast of Orthodoxy – Official end of Iconoclasm: Empress Theodora II restores the veneration of icons in the Orthodox churches in the Byzantine Empire. 
 Theodora II orders a persecution against the Paulicians throughout Anatolia; about 100,000 followers in the Byzantine theme of Armenia are massacred.

Births 
 Judith of Flanders, queen of Wessex and countess of Flanders (approximate date)

Deaths 
 April 19 – Judith of Bavaria, Frankish empress
 Al-Mada'ini, Muslim scholar and historian (b. 752)
 Ardo Smaragdus, Frankish abbot and hagiographer
 Bridei VI, king of the Picts (Scotland)
 Fergus mac Fothaid, king of Connacht (Ireland)
 Fujiwara no Otsugu, Japanese statesman (b. 773)
 Jia Dao, Chinese poet and Buddhist monk (b. 779)
 Landulf I, gastald (or count) of Capua (Italy)
 Liu Congjian, Chinese governor (jiedushi) (b. 803)
 Qiu Shiliang, Chinese eunuch official
 Renaud d'Herbauges, Frankish nobleman (b. 795)

References